The genus Helichrysum  consists of an estimated 600 species of flowering plants in the sunflower family (Asteraceae). The type species is Helichrysum orientale. They often go by the names everlasting, immortelle, and strawflower.

It occurs in Africa (with 244 species in South Africa), Madagascar, Australasia and Eurasia. The genus was a wastebasket taxon, and many of its members have been reclassified in smaller genera, most notably the Everlastings, now in the genus Xerochrysum.

Their leaves are oblong to lanceolate. They are flat and pubescent on both sides. The bristles of the pappus are scabrous, barbellate, or plumose.

The receptacle (base of the flower head) is often smooth, with a fringed margin, or honey-combed, and resemble daisies. They may be in almost all colors, except blue. There are many capitula and generally flat-topped corymbs or panicles. The corolla lobes show glandular hairs at the abaxial surface.

Helichrysum species are used as food plants by the larvae of some Lepidoptera species including the bucculaticid leaf-miners Bucculatrix gnaphaliella (which feeds exclusively on Helichrysum arenarium) and Bucculatrix helichrysella (feeds exclusively on H. italicum) and the Coleophora case-bearers C. caelebipennella, C. gnaphalii (feeds exclusively on H arenarium) and C. helichrysiella (feeds exclusively on H. italicum).

Species

Hilliard (1983) divided this large and heterogeneous genus in 30 morphological groups. But the genus remains controversial and is considered by many to be an artificial genus. The taxonomy of this large polymorphic and probably polyphyletic genus is complex and not yet satisfactorily resolved. Several Australian species, such as H. acuminatum and H. bracteatum, have been reclassified in the genus Xerochrysum in 1991, resp. as X. subundulatum and X. bracteatum. In 1989, misaligned species of Helichrysum were reclassified in Syncarpha. Species included in Pseudognaphalium, Anaphalis, Achyrocline and Humeocline are probably congeneric with Helichrysum. Australian species have also been reclassified to the genus Chrysocephalum, including Chrysocephalum semipapposum and Chrysocephalum apiculatum.

Uses

Several species are grown as ornamental plants, and for dried flowers. When cut young and dried, the open flowers and stalks preserve their colour and shape for long periods.

Helichrysum italicum (synonym Helichrysum angustifolium) is steam distilled to produce a yellow-reddish essential oil popular in fragrance for its unique scent, best described as herbaceous, sweet, and honey-like. The epithet angustifolium means narrow leaved. It is commonly misspelled as augustifolium.

Gallery

References

Further reading
 HILLIARD, O. 1983. Flora of Southern Africa, Part 7 Inuleae, Fascicle 2 Gnaphaliinae. Government Printer, Pretoria, South Africa.
 WILSON, P.G. 1992c. The classification of some Australian species currently included in Helipterum and Helichrysum (Asteraceae: Gnaphalieae): part 3 Anemocarpa and Argentipallium, two new genera from Australia. Nuytsia 8: 447–460.
 Mesfin Tadesse & Reilly, T. 1995. 17. A contribution to studies on Helichrysum (Compositae - Gnaphalieae) - a revision of the species of north-east tropical Africa. In: Advances in Compositae Systematics (eds. D.J.H. Hind, C. Jeffrey & G.V. Pope). Royal Botanic Gardens, Kew, pp. 379–450.

External links
 
 
 Xeranthemum annuum photo
 Phylogenetic relationships within this genus
 Helichrysum Essential Oil species
 PHYLOGENY OF SOUTH AFRICAN GNAPHALIEAE (ASTERACEAE)
 Details of botanical naming
 

 
Asteraceae genera
Taxa named by Philip Miller